Honduras competed at the 1996 Summer Olympics in Atlanta, United States.

Athletics

Women
Track & road events

Boxing

Men's Light Flyweight (– 48 kg)
Geovany Baca
 First Round — Lost to Anicet Rasoanaivo (Madagascar) on points (0-12)

Men's Flyweight (– 51 kg)
Darwin Angeles
 First Round — Lost to Serhiy Kovhanko (Ukraine) on points (6-12)

Judo 

Leonardo Carcamo
Dora Maldonado
Jeny Rodríguez

Swimming 

Men

See also
Honduras at the 1995 Pan American Games
Honduras at the 1998 Central American and Caribbean Games

References
Official Olympic Reports
sports-reference

Nations at the 1996 Summer Olympics
1996
Olympics